Tinguiririca River is a river of Chile located in the Libertador General Bernardo O'Higgins Region. It rises in the Andes, at the confluence of the rivers Las Damas and Del Azufre. From its source, it flows northwest for about 56 km to the vicinity of the city of San Fernando. In this portion of its course, the river receives the waters of the tributaries Clarillo and Claro. Then the river flows southwest and then turns northwest to empty into Rapel Lake.

See also
 Tinguiririca Volcano

References 
 Cuenca del río Rapel

Rivers of O'Higgins Region
Rivers of Chile